The 1948 Missouri Tigers football team was an American football team that represented the University of Missouri in the Big Seven Conference (Big 7) during the 1948 college football season. The team compiled an 8–3 record (5–1 against Big 7 opponents), finished in second place in the Big 7, lost to Clemson in the 1949 Gator Bowl, and outscored all opponents by a combined total of 331 to 161. Don Faurot was the head coach for the 11th of 19 seasons. The team played its home games at Memorial Stadium in Columbia, Missouri.

The team's statistical leaders included Dick Braznell with 484 rushing yards, Bus Entsminger with 633 passing yards, 1,084 yards of total offense, and 54 points scored, and Mel Sheehan with 346 receiving yards.

Schedule

References

Missouri
Missouri Tigers football seasons
Missouri Tigers football